The Day of the Triffids is a British science fiction drama serial which was first aired by BBC Television in 1981. An adaptation by Douglas Livingstone of the 1951 novel by John Wyndham, the six half-hour episodes were produced by David Maloney and directed by Ken Hannam, with original music by Christopher Gunning.

It premiered simultaneously in the UK and in Australia on ABC Television.

Plot
The series takes place in late 20th century Britain. A spectacular meteorite shower unexpectedly renders most of humanity blind, leading to the breakdown of society overnight. Unaware of this, Bill Masen (John Duttine) has retained his sight by virtue of being in hospital with his eyes bandaged at the time of the shower. Bill works on a Triffid farm, where the mobile and carnivorous plants are cultivated for their oil with their deadly stings retained, which improves the oil quality. Prior to the story he was stung by a plant and even though he was wearing protective clothing, some of the poison got into his eyes.  In the hospital he tentatively removes the bandages and gradually discovers the catastrophe around him.

He rescues Josella "Jo" Playton (Emma Relph) from her blind captor and finds that she had slept through the meteorite shower thus keeping her sight. They eventually come across a small band of similarly lucky survivors who have decided to leave London and establish a community elsewhere to begin rebuilding civilisation. They are initially opposed by sighted Jack Coker (Maurice Colbourne), who wants them to stay in London and help the blind, not abandon them. When the others reject his scheme, he and a few sighted helpers capture some of the group, including Bill and Jo. He assigns each to a different group of the blind. Bill is handcuffed to two of his charges to prevent him leaving them.

The Triffids get loose and run amok amongst the helpless blind human population, slaughtering and feeding on them. Between the Triffids and a mysterious deadly disease, most of Bill's group eventually die; the rest scatter. Bill starts searching for Jo and teams up with Jack, who admits his plan did not work as he had hoped. They drive through the English countryside and encounter part of the group that had left London. The group had split after a disagreement over morality: the ones who stayed behind, led by Miss Durrant (Perlita Neilson), refused to accept that polygamy would be necessary to repopulate the world. After more fruitless searching, Jack decides to return to Miss Durrant's community.

Bill meets a young girl, Susan, and she accompanies him. Finally, he recalls that Jo had spoken of a place belonging to her friends in the Sussex Downs. There he is reunited with her and after erecting a protective fence around the farm to keep out the Triffids, they settle down and start raising a family. Six years pass, and one day Jack shows up in a helicopter. Miss Durrant's group had been wiped out by the disease but the other faction had secured the Isle of Wight and exterminated the local Triffid population. With the situation gradually deteriorating where they are, Bill, Jo, and the blind friends who own the farm, as well as the children prepare to join them.

Before they can leave, several uniformed men arrive in an armoured car the next day; they are part of an organisation that is setting up a feudal society, with the sighted as the new aristocracy. In their setup, one sighted person is in charge of ten of the blind. They plan to assign more blind people to Bill and Jo, and take Susan away to learn how to care for others. Bill gets the soldiers drunk and sabotages their armoured vehicle. Early the next morning, Bill and the rest of the group drive away, leaving the gates open for the besieging Triffids as they approach the soldiers.

Cast

Major characters
 John Duttine as Bill Masen
 Emma Relph as Josella Payton
 Maurice Colbourne as Jack Coker

Minor characters
 Stephen Yardley as John
 Gary Olsen as Torrence
 Lorna Charles as Susan (teenaged)
 Emily Dean as Susan (young)

Production

The Triffid plants
A Triffid was operated by a man crouched inside, cooled by a fan installed in its neck; the 'clackers' were radio controlled. The gnarled bole, based on the ginseng root, was made of latex with a covering of sawdust and string while the neck was fibreglass and continued down to the floor, where it joined with the operator's seat. The plant was surmounted by a flexible rubber head, coated with clear gunge.

After the end of the production, one was displayed for a while in the Natural History Museum in London;
they were designed by Steve Drewett who worked there. Copies of the props later were fellow guests at a cocktail party with Angus Deayton during an episode of Alexei Sayle's Stuff (see "External Links" below).

Filming locations
Some of the locations used in the series, such as the University of London's Senate House, corresponded to those specified in the book. Many of the locations used during filming can be located by studying the street names and other signs which appear in the show. For example, Jo's family home appears to be 2 Heath Side, which is adjacent to Hampstead Heath in London NW3. Jo's car breaks down at the junction of Remington Street and Nelson Place in Islington in episode 2, and Jo and Bill first meet yards away from that location in a stairwell on the Theseus Estate, before running along Theseus Walk in episode 3.

Critical reception
The British Film Institute's Screenonline wrote, "This remains a compelling and understated thriller. As with the same year's classic The Nightmare Man (BBC), it represents serious and unsentimental science fiction with John Duttine, in particular, excelling as the battling and bewildered protagonist, struggling to survive in a blind, brutal world. Critic David Pringle termed the original novel "a very enjoyable catastrophe", and to the production team's credit the same can be said of this involving and intelligent adaptation."

Home media
The series was released on DVD in the UK on 4 April 2005 and in Australia on 6 June 2005. A US DVD (through BBC Home Video) was released on 1 October 2007. A Blu-ray of the series was released on 7 September 2020 in the UK.

Broadcast
The series was repeated on BBC1 (7 March 1984 – 11 April 1984), Satellite channel UK Gold screened the series in 1996, 2004 and 2005 and the Sci-Fi channel broadcast the series in 2006. BBC Four has also screened the series in 2006, 2009 and 2014. 

As of 2014 it is streaming in the US on Hulu.

The series was shown in New Zealand in the 1980s on TVNZ.

References

External links
 
 
 The Day of the Triffids at Clivebanks.co.uk
 The Day of the Triffids at Action TV
 British Film Institute Screen Online (1981) series

1981 British television series debuts
1981 British television series endings
BBC television dramas
Television shows based on British novels
British science fiction television shows
1980s British drama television series
English-language television shows
1980s British science fiction television series
1980s British television miniseries